Sir Charles Brinsley Pemberton Peake  (2 January 1897 – 10 April 1958) was a British diplomat.

Early life and career 
Peake served in the Royal Leicestershire Regiment during the First World War, being commissioned into the 1/4th Battalion in 1915. He was awarded the Military Cross in June 1916. His service also included attachment to the regiment's 9th Battalion. Peake was discharged in 1918.

He joined Her Majesty's Diplomatic Service in 1922. His first appointment was in Sofia, subsequently being posted to Tokyo, Paris, Washington, D.C., and Tangier.

In 1939, Peake became head of the Foreign Office News Department and chief press adviser at the Ministry of Information. In 1941 he was posted to Washington as Acting Counsellor.

In 1946 he became Ambassador to Yugoslavia, before his appointment as Ambassador to Greece in 1951. He served in the position until 1957.

He was invested as a Knight Grand Cross of the Order of St Michael and St George in 1956.

Personal life 
Peake married Catherine Marie Knight, with whom he had four sons.

References

1897 births
1958 deaths
People educated at Wyggeston Grammar School for Boys
Royal Leicestershire Regiment officers
Recipients of the Military Cross
Knights Grand Cross of the Order of St Michael and St George
Ambassadors of the United Kingdom to Yugoslavia
Ambassadors of the United Kingdom to Greece